SVSC may refer to:

 Scottish Venezuela Solidarity Campaign, a political group
 Seethamma Vakitlo Sirimalle Chettu, a Telugu-language film